Josef Reiter may refer to:

 Josef Reiter (composer) (1862–1939), Austrian composer
 Josef Reiter (judoka) (born 1959), judoka from Austria